Pat Thomas (born September 1, 1954) is a former American football player in the National Football League (NFL). Thomas primarily played cornerback but also played at running back and placekicker.

Early life
Thomas was born in Plano, Texas. He attended Plano High School where he played on the 1971 state championship team.

College career
Thomas attended Texas A&M University. He was an All-American player at Texas A&M University.

Professional career
Thomas was drafted by the Los Angeles Rams in the 2nd round (39th overall) of the 1976 NFL Draft. He played in the NFL for the Los Angeles Rams from 1976 to 1982. He was twice named an All-Pro selection, in 1978 and 1980.

Thomas began his coaching career with the Houston Gamblers of the United States Football League in 1983. In 1985, Thomas became a coach for the University of Houston. He served in this position until 1989. He then moved to the National Football League to be a coach of the Houston Oilers until 1992. From 1993 to 2000, Thomas was the defensive backs coach of the Indianapolis Colts.

In 2001, Thomas was named as the defensive backs/conerbacks coach for the Buffalo Bills. As of 2006, he was no longer in that position.

Life after the NFL
Thomas started coaching at St. Joseph's Collegiate Institute in Buffalo New York in 2006. One student of specific note to Thomas was Naaman Roosevelt, who went on to break the record for most touchdown passes in a single season in western New York, and to play receiver at the University of Buffalo. He is the Father of Heather McCarthy, Patrick Thomas, Jr., Tamara Thomas and Joshua Thomas.

References

External links
 
 Pro-Football-Reference.com

1954 births
Living people
All-American college football players
American football cornerbacks
American football running backs
American football placekickers
Buffalo Bills coaches
Houston Cougars football coaches
Houston Oilers coaches
Indianapolis Colts coaches
Los Angeles Rams players
National Conference Pro Bowl players
Sportspeople from Plano, Texas
Texas A&M Aggies football players
United States Football League coaches
Players of American football from Texas